The following are the national records in athletics in Antigua and Barbuda maintained by the country's national athletics federation: Athletic Association of Antigua & Barbuda (ABAA).

Outdoor

Key to tables:

h = hand timing

OT = oversized track (> 200m in circumference)

Men

Women

Indoor

Men

Women

Notes

References
General
World Athletics Statistic Handbook 2019: National Outdoor Records
World Athletics Statistic Handbook 2018: National Indoor Records
Specific

Antigua
records
Athletics
Athletics